The speckle-headed whipsnake (Ahaetulla fasciolata) is a species of snake of the family Colubridae.

Geographic range
The snake is found in Asia.

References 

Reptiles described in 1885
Ahaetulla
Snakes of Asia